The 1968–69 Ice hockey Bundesliga season was the 11th season of the Ice hockey Bundesliga, the top level of ice hockey in Germany. 12 teams participated in the league, and EV Fussen won the championship.

First round

West

South

Relegation round

West

South

Final round

References

External links
Season on hockeyarchives.info

Eishockey-Bundesliga seasons
German
Bund